

Description
The counties that make up southwestern Virginia and northeastern Tennessee are linked historically, culturally, and geographically.  The shared decorative arts tradition of this region is known as the Great Road Style, so called because of the region’s historical importance as a stage route connecting the eastern seaboard with the western frontier.  The material culture of this region is evidenced in distinctive forms of furniture, ceramics, textiles, and metalwork. 

The first substantive effort to conduct primary research of the Great Road Style's decorative artifacts is Great Road Style: The Decorative Arts Legacy of Southwest Virginia and Northeast Tennessee, by Betsy White.  The book involved thousands of hours’ worth of fieldwork conducted across Tennessee and Virginia in an attempt to offer the most detailed accounting possible of handmade objects produced along the Great Road before 1940.

The eventual product of that exhaustive research was an archive of photographs, slides, and data sheets on more than two thousand objects representing diverse sectors of the survey area. In organizing and providing a narrative for this treasure trove of material, White and her research team have defined and delineated for the first time what constitutes Great Road Style.

Cultural Heritage Project
The ongoing Cultural Heritage Project at the William King Regional Arts Center seeks to document the cultural and artistic legacy of Southwest Virginia and Northeast Tennessee from 1780 to 1940, and to foster a full and accurate appreciation of the region's role in American decorative and folk arts. To date, field researchers have identified more than 2,000 objects made by hand in the region, and eight exhibitions have been mounted from that research. Reproductions of selected heritage items can be purchased online at the William King Regional Arts Center Looking Glass Museum Store.  Documentation and research is ongoing.
American art movements